Shubham Sarangi (born 24 June 2000) is an Indian professional footballer who plays as a defender for Odisha in the Indian Super League.

Early life
Sarangi was born in Visakhapatnam to parents from Balasore, Odisha. His family moved to Delhi when he was four, where he grew up playing football since his childhood days. During his childhood, he played in Kargil War Martyr Captain Vijayant Thapar Memorial Cup for his Army Public School, Noida. He represented India in 2013 U-14 AFC qualifying tournament held in Iran. Thereafter, he was drafted to the U-17 World Cup project for India and continued training in Goa, traveled to various countries as part of the exposure trip organised by the AIFF.

In 2015-16, he played for the Minerva Punjab F.C. Academy and participated U-15 & U-18 I-League scoring 8 Goals in the League, and was placed among the top goal scorers in the League. He continued to play for India national U-17 squad World Cup football team thereafter.

In 2018, Sarangi went to the Aspire Academy of Qatar for a four-month training stint.

Club career

Delhi Dynamos
Signed by Delhi Dynamos FC in 2017–18, he was sent to the Aspire Academy, leading international Academy based in Doha, for youth development and training for five and half months.
On his return, he made 9 appearances for Delhi Dynamos in the 2018–19 season, playing as a right back.

Odisha FC
Delhi Dynamos FC were re-branded as Odisha FC prior to the 2019–20 season. Shubham made 17 appearances in the club's inaugural season as Odisha FC.

References

External links 
ISL Profile 

2000 births
Living people
Footballers from Delhi
Footballers from Odisha
Indian footballers
Association football midfielders
I-League players
I-League 2nd Division players
Indian Super League players
India youth international footballers
RoundGlass Punjab FC players
Odisha FC players